Tomás Ó Cellaigh was a Catholic Bishop of Clonfert. His death is recorded as 6 January 1263. 
O Cellaigh was elected to that position sometime prior to 7 November 1259, as he received possession of temporalities commencing on that date.

His name is also recorded as Tomás mac Domnaill Móir Ó Cellaig. He was probably from Ui Maine.

References
http://www.ucc.ie/celt/published/T100005C/ http://www.ucc.ie/celt/published/T100005C/
http://www.ucc.ie/celt/published/G105007/index.html http://www.ucc.ie/celt/published/G105007/index.html
The Surnames of Ireland, Edward MacLysaght, 1978
A New History of Ireland: Volume IX - Maps, Genealogies, Lists, ed. T.W. Moody, F.X. Martin, F.J. Byrne

People from County Galway
Medieval Gaels from Ireland
13th-century Roman Catholic bishops in Ireland
1263 deaths
Year of birth unknown
Bishops of Clonfert